Red, White & Crüe is the eighth compilation album by the heavy metal band Mötley Crüe, released on February 1, 2005 by Mötley Records and charted at number 6 on The Billboard 200. To coincide with the album's release, the band reunited with drummer Tommy Lee, who left the band in 1999.

Background
Bassist Nikki Sixx commented on the band's reunion, comparing it to "seeing Mike Tyson fight. He probably won’t bite anyone’s ear off — but you’re there in case he does."

According to vocalist Vince Neil, the early stages of the band's reunion were "kinda' strained. I hadn’t talked to Tommy Lee in years. Everyone was really guarded and had their managers there. It was very strange. Mick Mars was home, I guess. Either there or the hospital."

Release and promotion
Red, White & Crüe features three new studio recordings: the album's lead single, "If I Die Tomorrow", co-written by pop punk band Simple Plan, the second single "Sick Love Song" and "Street Fighting Man", a Rolling Stones cover. Tommy Lee does not perform on the cover of  "Street Fighting Man"; drumming duties were handled by Josh Freese of The Vandals. The album also features previously unreleased tracks "Black Widow" and the Japanese bonus track "I'm a Liar".

Red, White & Crüe is certified platinum.

A video was made for "Sick Love Song," though the video, mostly composed of produced concert clips, got only scarce airplay, the song found its way onto some rock-oriented radio stations.

A special edition that includes a "Greatest Video Hits" DVD compilation was also made.

Track listing
Disc 1

Disc 2

Single Disc Version track listing
"Live Wire"
"Piece of Your Action"
"Black Widow"
"Looks That Kill"
"Too Young to Fall in Love" (Remix)
"Shout at the Devil"
"Girls, Girls, Girls"
"Wild Side"
"Kickstart My Heart"
"Dr. Feelgood"
"Primal Scream"
"Home Sweet Home '91" Remix
"Hooligan's Holiday" (Brown Nose Edit)
"Beauty"
"Bitter Pill"
"Hell On High Heels"
"If I Die Tomorrow" (Rock Mix)
"Sick Love Song"

Charts

Certifications

References

External links
 Official Website

Mötley Crüe compilation albums
2005 compilation albums